Loft is a method to create complicated smooth 3D shapes in CAD and other 3D modeling software.  Planar cross-sections of the desired shape are defined at chosen locations. Algorithms find a smooth 3D shape that fit these cross-sections. Designers can modify the shape through choice of fitting algorithm and input parameters. The method is used in packages such as Onshape, 3D Studio Max, Creo*, SolidWorks, NX, Autodesk Revit, and FreeCAD. 

Consider lofting process in boat building, to visualise the process. The planar sections are defined by boat ribs spaced along its length. The final shape is produced by placing planks over the ribs to form a smooth skin. 

In PTCs Creo and in Autodesk Revit it is referred to as a Blend or Swept Blend.

See also 
 Parallel transport
 Lathe (graphics)

Examples (external links)
 Modeling an irregular funnel with the loft tool

Computer-aided design